Lamnao Singto born 15 April 1988 in Luang Prabang, is a Laotian former football player. He played for several clubs in Thailand, including the Provincial Electricity Authority (now known as Buriram United), but he is most known for his time in YOTHA FC (MCTPC FC) in the Lao Premier League.

He retired in 2013 and became a coach, assisting Dave Booth in the 2014 AFF Championship.

He featured in Beerlao's advertisement for the 2009 Southeast Asian Games, which was held in Vientiane.

International career

International goals
Scores and results list Laos' goal tally first.

References

External links
 

1988 births
Living people
People from Luang Prabang
Laotian footballers
Association football forwards
Yotha F.C. players
Lamnao Singto
Lamnao Singto
Lamnao Singto
Laotian expatriate sportspeople in Thailand
Laotian expatriate footballers
Expatriate footballers in Thailand
Laos international footballers